Alexander Rembrandt McClintock (1901 – 1968), generally known as Rem, was a professional lithographer based in Melbourne, Australia, active in the 1930s through the 1950s.

McClintock was son of the artist Alexander McClintock, cousin of Herbert McClintock, and mentor to the artist Peter Benjamin Graham.

References 
 Smith, Bernard, Noel Counihan Artist and Revolutionary, Oxford University Press Australia, 1993 

Australian printmakers
Australian lithographers
1901 births
1968 deaths
Place of birth missing
Place of death missing
20th-century lithographers